Euphorbia caput-medusae ("Medusa's Head") is a plant of the genus Euphorbia that occurs in and around Cape Town, South Africa.

Description
This succulent resembles the head of Medusa, with many serpent-like stems arising from a short, central caudex. They sometimes exceed 1 metre in diameter, partly buried in the ground, covered with numerous crowded branches.

Euphorbia caput-medusae was introduced to the Netherlands around 1700 and was one of the early plants described by Linnaeus (Species Plantarum, 1753).

Distribution
This species is primarily coastal, occurring along the western coast of South Africa, southwards to the Cape Peninsula. 
It is still common around Cape Town where it grows in deep sand or rocky outcrops on the coast. It is particularly common in the Peninsula Shale Renosterveld vegetation of Signal Hill. 

It also occurs along the south coast of the Western Cape Province, from Cape Town the form previously known as "muirii" extends along the coast eastwards as far as Mossel Bay.

References

External links 
 IPNI.org: listing for Euphorbia caput-medusae

caput-medusae
Endemic flora of South Africa
Flora of the Cape Provinces
Renosterveld
Plants described in 1753
Taxa named by Carl Linnaeus